KRI Spica (934) is the second hydro oceanographic auxiliary ship belonging to the Indonesian Navy which was built at the OCEA shipyard, Les Sables-d'Olonne, France, after her sister ship KRI Rigel (933) was completed. Spica is taken from the name of the brightest star in the constellation Virgo.

References

Auxiliary ships of the Indonesian Navy
2015 ships